MacDonald Highlands is an affluent residential neighborhood in Henderson, Nevada in the foothills of Black Mountain. The neighborhood is part of the Las Vegas Valley and is one of Henderson's most sought after luxury custom home communities.

The highlands are situated approximately 15 miles (25 km) from the Las Vegas Strip and 20 miles (32 km) from downtown Las Vegas. It sits on the edges of the McCullough Mountains and overlooks much of Henderson and the Las Vegas Valley.

An exclusive guard gated community and home to DragonRidge Country Club, it is bordered by the communities of Del Webb to the west, The Canyons to the southwest, McCullough Hills to the northeast and west, and Green Valley Ranch to the northwest. MacDonald Highlands is also adjacent to the neighborhoods of Ascaya and Roma Hills.

Notable residents include Nancy Walton Laurie, who purchased a home in the neighborhood in 2007 for $17.5 million and Oscar De La Hoya who purchased a home for $14.6 million in 2022. Billionaire Anthony Hsieh, founder of mortgage firm LoanDepot, purchased a newly built mansion for $25 million and set a new record for the most expensive residential sale in the history of Las Vegas real estate in 2021.

See also 
Southern Highlands Golf Club

References

External links
 MacDonald Highlands Official Site

Geography of Henderson, Nevada